Brachypea is a genus of worms belonging to the family Convolutidae.

Species:
 Brachypea kenoma Antonius, 1968

References

Acoelomorphs